Protein phosphatase 1A is an enzyme that in humans is encoded by the PPM1A gene.

The protein encoded by this gene is a member of the PP2C family of Ser/Thr protein phosphatases. PP2C family members are known to be negative regulators of cell stress response pathways. This phosphatase dephosphorylates, and negatively regulates the activities of, MAP kinases and MAP kinase kinases. It has been shown to inhibit the activation of p38 and JNK kinase cascades induced by environmental stresses. This phosphatase can also dephosphorylate cyclin-dependent kinases, and thus may be involved in cell cycle control. Overexpression of this phosphatase is reported to activate the expression of the tumor suppressor gene TP53/p53, which leads to G2/M cell cycle arrest and apoptosis. Three alternatively spliced transcript variants encoding two distinct isoforms have been described.

Interactions 

PPM1A has been shown to interact with Metabotropic glutamate receptor 3.
In 2006, Dr. Feng found that PPM1A can terminate TGF-beta signaling by inactivating Smad3 via dephosphorylation. Smad3 is an essential component of the TGF-beta signalling pathway.

References

Further reading